Kaner may refer to:

People with the surname 
 Cem Kaner (fl. from 1988), American professor of software engineering
 Jake Kaner (born 1959), British academic
 Matthew Kaner (born 1986), British composer 
 Ömer Kaner (born 1959), Turkish footballer
 Richard Kaner (fl. from 1984), American chemist
 Walter Kaner (1920–2005), American journalist

Places 
 Kaner State, a village and former princely state in Kathiawar, Gujarat, India

Jewish surnames
Kohenitic surnames
Jewish families